James Gayle was the sixth head football coach at Tuskegee University in Tuskegee, Alabama and he held that position for five seasons, from 1917 to 1921.  His coaching record at Tuskegee was 22–6–2.

References

Year of birth missing
Year of death missing
Tuskegee Golden Tigers football coaches
Hampton University alumni